Berioana is a genus of moths of the family Noctuidae. It was described by David Stephen Fletcher and Pierre Viette in 1962.

Species
 Berioana limbulata (Berio, 1955)
 Berioana pauliana Viette, 1963

References

 
 

Hadeninae